Hafız Ahmed Pasha (1564 in Plovdiv, Ottoman Empire – 10 February 1632 in Istanbul), also known by epithet Müezzinzade ("muezzin's son"), was an Ottoman grand vizier. Born as son of a Pomak muezzin, he went to Istanbul at the age of 15 and was an employee in the sultan's palace for many years. From 1609 on, he became Governor of Damascus  (Damascus), Van (Turkey), Erzurum (Turkey), Baghdad (Iraq), and other Anatolian eyalets.

He served as grand vizier twice and was killed in office during a revolt on 10 February 1632, when the Janissaries attempted to overthrow Sultan Murad IV.

See also
 List of Ottoman Grand Viziers

References

Pashas
Politicians from Plovdiv
1564 births
1632 deaths
Burials at Karacaahmet Cemetery
17th-century Grand Viziers of the Ottoman Empire
Assassinated people from the Ottoman Empire
People from the Ottoman Empire of Pomak descent
Ottoman governors of Baghdad
Ottoman governors of Damascus
Ottoman people of the Ottoman–Persian Wars